John Woolley (15 January 1886 – 20 November 1957) was a former Australian rules footballer who played with Essendon, Melbourne and Carlton in the Victorian Football League (VFL).

Notes

External links 		
		
Jack Woolley's profile at Blueseum			
		
		
1886 births		
1957 deaths		
Australian rules footballers from Victoria (Australia)		
Australian Rules footballers: place kick exponents
Essendon Football Club players		
Melbourne Football Club players		
Carlton Football Club players
South Yarra Football Club players
Hawthorn Football Club (VFA) players
Preston Football Club (VFA) players
Northcote Football Club players
People from Mornington Peninsula